Scott Kinsey is a keyboardist and member of the band Tribal Tech. He is a 1991 graduate of the Berklee College of Music in Boston.

Career
In addition to playing in Tribal Tech with Scott Henderson and Gary Willis, Kinsey has worked with philanthropist Paul Allen, Dan Aykroyd, Philip Bailey, Bob Belden, Concha Buika, Danny Carey, Jimmy Earl, Bill Evans, Robben Ford, Matt Garrison, Tim Hagans, David Holmes, James Moody, Norrbotten Big Band, Nicholas Payton, Kurt Rosenwinkel, Serj Tankian, Anne Sofie von Otter, Joe Walsh, WDR Big Band, Gary Willis, Torsten de Winkel, Joe Zawinul, and Uncle Moe's Space Ranch with guitarists Brett Garsed and T. J. Helmerich.

Kinsey has produced albums by Philip Bailey (Soul On Jazz), Joe Zawinul (Faces and Places), Tim Hagans (Imagination Animation and ReAnimation) Tribal Tech (TTX, Reality Check, Thick, Rocket Science), Scott Henderson (Dog Party, Tore Down House) Gary Willis (Bent), and James Moody (Homage). His work appeared on the soundtracks to the films Ocean's Eleven, Ocean's Twelve Ocean's Thirteen, Code 46, Stander, Confessions of a Dangerous Mind, Brown Sugar, and Analyze That.

Kinsey was a protégé of Joe Zawinul, the executive producer of the European version of Kinsey's first album, Kinesthetics.

Discography

As leader
 Kinesthetics (Abstract Logix, 2006)
 Near Life Experience (Abstract Logix, 2016)
 No Sleep (Kinesthetic Music, 2017)
 Arc Trio (Blue Canoe, 2018)
 We Speak Luniwaz (Whirlwind, 2019)

With Human Element
 Human Element (Abstract Logix, 2010)

With Kurt Rosenwinkel
 Do It 1992 (Heartcore, 2019)[limited edition] – recorded in 1992

With Tribal Tech
 Illicit (Bluemoon, 1992)
 Face First (Bluemoon, 1993)
 Reality Check (Mesa/Bluemoon, 1995)
 Thick (Cream, 1999)
 Rocket Science (ESC, 2000)
  X (Tone Center, 2012)

With Uncle Moe's Space Ranch
 Uncle's Moe's Space Ranch (Tone Center, 2001)
 Moe's Town (Tone Center, 2007)

As sideman
With Bob Belden
 Princejazz (Somethin' Else, 1994)
 Tapestry (Blue Note, 1997)
 Black Dahlia (Blue Note, 2001)

With Tim Hagans
 Animation/Imagination (Blue Note, 1999)
 Re-Animation Live! with Bob Belden (Blue Note, 1999)
 Future Miles (ACT, 2002)

With Scott Henderson
 Dog Party (Mesa, 1994)
 Tore Down House (Mesa/Bluemoon, 1997)
 Well to the Bone (ESC, 2002)

With Gary Willis
 No Sweat (Alchemy, 1996)
 Bent (Alchemy, 1998)
 Larger Than Life (Abstract Logix, 2015)

With others
 Philip Bailey, Soul on Jazz (Heads Up, 2002)
 Jeff Berlin, Taking Notes (Denon, 1997)
 Ranjit Barot, Bada Boom (EMI, 2010)
 Sandeep Chowta, Matters of the Heart (Sony, 2013)
 Jimmy Earl, Renewing Disguises (Severn 2014)
 Jimmy Herring, Lifeboat (Abstract Logix, 2008)
 David Holmes, Presents the Free Association (13 Amp, 2003)
 Robert Hurst, Bob Ya Head (Bebob, 2010)
 Michael Landau, Live (Tone Center, 2006)
 The Manhattan Transfer, The Chick Corea Songbook (4Q, 2009)
 Kurt Rosenwinkel, The Enemies of Energy (Verve, 2000)
 Michael Waldrop, Origin Suite (Origin, 2018)
Gianfranco Continenza, The Past Inside The Present (ESC Records, ESC 3725)

References

Sources
 All About Jazz interview
 Kinesthetics Main Page

External links
 Official site

Year of birth missing (living people)
Living people
Musicians from Michigan
People from Owosso, Michigan
Berklee College of Music alumni
21st-century American keyboardists
Tribal Tech members
Whirlwind Recordings artists